Selemdzhinsk is a rural locality (a settlement) in Stoybinsky Selsoviet of Selemdzhinsky District, Amur Oblast, Russia. The population was 22 as of 2018.

Geography 
Selemdzhinsk is located on the right bank of the Selemdzha River, 180 km southwest of Ekimchan (the district's administrative centre) by road. Fevralskoye is the nearest rural locality.

References 

Rural localities in Selemdzhinsky District